The olive blind snake (Ramphotyphlops olivaceus) is a species of snake in the Typhlopidae family.

References

Ramphotyphlops
Reptiles described in 1845
Taxa named by John Edward Gray